Bendigo Art Gallery is an Australian art gallery located in Bendigo, Victoria. It is one of the oldest and largest regional art galleries.

History
The gallery was founded in 1887.

The gallery's collection was first housed in the former Bendigo Volunteer Rifle's room, converted into an exhibition space by Bendigo architect William Charles Vahland (1828–1915) in 1890 and renamed Bolton Court. In 1897 it was extended with Drury Court, designed by local architect William Beebe. In 1962 the gallery was again extended with office space and additional exhibition spaces, as well as a new entrance.

From 1998 to 2001 the gallery was refurbished and expanded with a new sculpture gallery designed by Fender Katsalidis Architects.

Description
Bendigo Art Gallery is one of Australia’s oldest and largest regional art galleries.

Collection
The gallery's collection has a strong emphasis on British and European Continental 19th-century painting, with works by Ernest Waterlow and Pierre Puvis de Chavannes among others. Australian work from the 19th century onwards is also well represented, including Charles Conder and Arthur Streeton.

Prizes 
The gallery hosts Australia's richest open painting prize, the Arthur Guy Memorial Painting Prize, worth , which was launched in 2003.
Other prizes have included:
 Paul Guest Prize
 Robert Jacks Drawing Prize (past prize)

People
Karen Quinlan was director of Bendigo Art Gallery from around 2000 to 2018, and curator for three years before that. She was also Professor of Practice at the La Trobe Art Institute at Bendigo. She took up the post of leading the National Portrait Gallery in Canberra in December 2018. During her tenure at Bendigo, Quinlan worked with international institutions to bring large exhibitions to Bendigo, which boosted the regional economy and encouraged cultural tourism. She was made a Member of the Order of Australia in the 2019 Australia Day Honours list, "for her significant service to the visual arts and to higher education".

Logo
The gallery's logo is an image of Ettore Cadorin's statue Venus tying her sandals (1913). Cadorin was an Italian-born American, but was married to an Australian contralto, Erna Mueller, who trained at the Bendigo Conservatory. He sold the statue to the gallery after visiting it in 1913.

References

External links 
 

Art museums and galleries in Victoria (Australia)
Buildings and structures in Bendigo
1887 establishments in Australia
Art museums established in 1887
Bendigo